Peter Brown may refer to:

Business
 Peter T. Brown, former executive director of the Free Software Foundation
 Peter Brown (lecturer), managing director of the Irish Institute of Financial Trading
 Peter M. Brown (born 1941), Canadian businessman
 Peter Fitzhugh Brown (born 1955), CEO of Renaissance Technologies

Music 
 Pete Brown (jazz musician) (1906–1963), American jazz saxophonist
 Peter Brown (singer) (born 1953), American funk singer, 1970s
 Pete Brown (born 1940), British rock singer, 1960s
 Peter Brown (music manager), personal assistant to The Beatles and Brian Epstein

Politics
 Peter Brown (Newfoundland politician) (c. 1797–1845), one of Newfoundland's first elected Member of House of Assembly
 Peter Brown (South African politician) (1924–2004), founding member of the South African Liberal Party
 Peter Brown (New Zealand politician) (born 1939), New Zealand First MP and former Deputy Party Leader, 1996–2008
 Peter Nicholas Brown (Peter Broun), (1797–1846), first Colonial Secretary of Western Australia (1829–1846)
 Peter Hoyt Brown (1936–2017), council member, city of Houston
 Peter Campbell Brown (1913–1994), corporation counsel for New York City and Justice Department official

Sports
 Pete Brown (golfer) (1935–2015), PGA Tour golfer
 Peter Brown (ice hockey) (born 1954), American ice hockey defenceman
 Pete Brown (American football) (1930–2001), American football player
 Peter Brown (rugby league) (born 1961), New Zealand rugby league footballer
 Peter Brown (rugby union) (born 1941), Scottish rugby union footballer
 Peter Brown (footballer, born 1934) (1934–2011), with Southampton and Wrexham
 Peter Brown (footballer, born 1961), English former footballer

Australian rules footballers
 Peter Brown (Australian footballer, born 1906) (1906–1988), North Melbourne player
 Peter Brown (Australian footballer, born 1949), Geelong player
 Peter Brown (Australian footballer, born 1952), South Melbourne player
 Peter Brown (Australian footballer, born 1957), Fitzroy player
 Peter Brown (Australian footballer, born 1958), Carlton and St Kilda player
 Peter Brown (Australian footballer, born 1963), St Kilda player

Literature, arts and entertainment
 Peter Brown (naturalist) (died 1799), British painter and natural history illustrator
 Peter Brown (British artist) (born 1967), British painter
 Peter Brown (illustrator) (born 1979), American illustrator of children's books
 Peter Brown (New Zealand artist) (1921–2005), NZ painter
 Peter Brown (actor) (1935–2016), American television actor
 Pete Brown (writer) (born 1968), UK writer on drink and drinking culture
 Peter Brown (Oz), child protagonist of the Oz books by Ruth Plumly Thompson
 Peter Currell Brown (born 1936), British novelist

Other
 Peter Browne (Mayflower passenger) (1594–1633), also spelled Brown, Pilgrim and English colonist, signer of the Mayflower Compact
 Peter Brown (British Army officer) (1775–1853), British Army officer interested in the welfare of soldiers' children
 Peter Brown (VC) (1837–1894), Swedish recipient of the Victoria Cross
 Peter Hume Brown (1849–1918), Scottish biographer and historian
 Peter Brown (historian) (born 1935), Irish historian and biographer specializing in Late Antiquity and the cult of Saints
 Peter Douglas Brown, historian of eighteenth-century British politics
 Peter Brown (bishop) (born 1947), New Zealand-born Catholic bishop in American Samoa
 Peter J. Brown,  American rear admiral in the US Coast Guard
 Peter J. Brown, computer scientist, developer of the Guide hypertext system and ML/I macro system

See also
 Peter Browne (disambiguation)